James Mawawi (born September 29, 1988) is a Ugandan politician and a member of Ugandan Parliament representing Adjumani East County. He was elected to the parliament on the ticket of National Resistance Movement (NRM).. In the eleventh parliament, he serves on the Committee on Presidential Affairs.

Life and education 
Mawawi was born in Itirikwa sub-county, Adjumani district to Brani Festo and Jovita Chandiga. He is married to Stella Komouo Mamawi with four children. He began his early education at Subbe Primary School and attended Monosbala Secondary School and St Benard's College in Masaka district for his secondary school education. He holds a diploma in Agribusiness Management and a bachelor's degree in Agriculture and Rural Innovation from Makerere University.

Political career 
Mawawi started his political career as a district councilor representing Itirikwa sub-county in the district council. He ran for the Adjumani East County seat in the parliament in the 2021 parliamentary election polling 9633 votes to beat the incumbent MP Dulu Mark Angel with 9354 votes.

References 

Ugandan politicians
National Resistance Movement politicians
Living people
1988 births
Makerere University alumni